List of Mountains in New Hampshire is a general list of mountains in New Hampshire, with elevation. This list includes many mountains in the White Mountains range that covers about a quarter of the state, as well as mountains outside of that range.

Some are included in lists of mountains, such as the Appalachian Mountain Club (AMC) list of the Hundred Highest peaks of New England, or the subset with elevations of over  — the "4000 Footers". (Many peaks with sufficient elevation are excluded from the AMC lists because they are not considered to have sufficient topographic prominence.

The Appalachian Trail (AT), a  National Scenic Trail from Georgia to Maine, runs through New Hampshire, crossing many of the mountain peaks. Several mountains are the sites of major alpine ski resorts.

See also 
 Peak bagging lists of New Hampshire mountains. These include:
 Northeast 111 4000-footers
 New England Four-thousand footers
 New England Hundred Highest
 New England Fifty Finest
 Mountain ranges in New Hampshire; see :Category:Mountain ranges of New Hampshire.
 List of mountains of the Appalachians

References 
  United States Board on Geographic Names – Geographic Names Information System
  DeLorme's New Hampshire Atlas and Gazetteer
  U.S. Geological Survey 7.5-minute/7.5x15-minute topographic map series

New Hampshire
Mountains
New Hampshire